Melitta eickworti is a species of melittid bee in the family Melittidae. It is found in North America.

References

Further reading

External links

 

Melittidae
Articles created by Qbugbot
Insects described in 1995